"Chapter 3" is the third episode of the sixth season of the anthology television series American Horror Story. It aired on September 28, 2016, on the cable network FX. The episode was written by James Wong and directed by Jennifer Lynch, marking the first time the series has had a female director.

Plot
Lee, Shelby, and Matt search with police and volunteers for Flora. In a nearby farmhouse, they find two dirt-encrusted young boys nursing from the teats of a dead sow. After bringing the police back to the farmhouse, the two boys are taken to the hospital, where they are revealed to be part of the Polk family. The boys only know one word, "Croatoan", and in an interview, Matt and Shelby reveal that the word came to be a warning for the pair of them.

Mason accuses Lee of Flora's disappearance, raising the question that Lee may be hiding Flora somewhere in an attempt to prevent him from changing the custody agreement. That night, Mason is killed. Matt and Shelby examine the tapes of the security cameras for clues as to who could have killed Mason. The evidence that they uncover leads back to Lee, leading to a heated arguments between the three of them.

Just then, a psychic named Cricket Marlowe walks through the door, who claims to be able to locate Flora, and Lee pays him $25,000. He reveals that Priscilla is a ghost from the 1500s and that Flora was abducted by the ghost of Thomasin White, wife of John White, the governor of Roanoke Colony. She was left in charge of the colony after White returned to England for supplies, but was later deposed and exiled after the colonists rebelled against Thomasin in her husband's absence. While dying of hunger in the woods, Thomasin was saved by an English witch, Scathach, and swore loyalty to her. After re-establishing her control of Roanoke, Thomasin moved the colony inland to the area where Matt and Shelby's house now stands.

Cricket leads the Millers back into the woods, where they tell Thomasin, that in exchange for returning Flora, the Millers will burn their house down and leave the land for good. Shelby balks at the idea and looks to Matt, but he has disappeared. She finds him having sex with Scathach while the Polks watch. When Lee returns to the home, she is arrested by the police.

Reception
"Chapter 3" was watched by 3.07 million people during its original broadcast, and gained a 1.7 ratings share among adults aged 18–49.

The episode earned a 93% approval rating on Rotten Tomatoes, based on 14 reviews with an average score of 6.6/10. The critical consensus reads, ""Chapter 3" ratchets up the action by finally exploring the hauntings of the Roanoke house and introducing a potential villain in gory AHS style."

References

External links

American Horror Story: Roanoke episodes